Meall Odhar is a mountain in the Scottish Highlands, situated about 3 km to the west of Tyndrum, close to the northern boundary of the Loch Lomond and the Trossachs National Park. Meall Odhar is part of the Tyndrum Hills. With a height of 656 m and a drop of 183 m, it is listed as a Marilyn and a Graham. The name Meall Odhar is from the Gaelic for "dun-coloured round hill".

References

Mountains and hills of Stirling (council area)
Grahams
Marilyns of Scotland